Step (also Olovyannaya) is an air base in Chita, Russia located 14 km northwest of Yasnogorsk. It is a large air base with two revetment areas and numerous military fortifications.  It is near an SS-11 missile field that was dismantled in the mid-1990s.

The 849th Assault Aviation Regiment, part of the 253rd Assault Aviation Division, was stationed at Step up until 1956.

Units stationed at Step/Olovyannaya include:
 6th Aviation Regiment of Fighter-Bombers (6 APIB) flying Sukhoi Su-17 in the late 1980s; under 23rd Air Army, Transbaikal Military District.
 58th Fighter-Bomber Aviation Regiment (58 APIB) flying Su-17M3 and L-29 aircraft in the late 1980s, and receiving MiG-27 in the early 1990s. It was under 23rd Air Army (Trans-Baikal).
 266th Independent Shturmovik Aviation Regiment (266th Assault Aviation Regiment, 266 OShAP) flying Sukhoi Su-25 aircraft. Disbanded circa 2009.

The base appears to have been closed after a boiler room fire in December 2009. Thereafter, the base was reopened and the 266th Independent Shturmovik Aviation Regiment was reformed with at least two squadrons of Sukhoi-25s in 2019. The regiment by this time had been shifted into the Eastern Military District's 11th Air and Air Defence Forces Army.

References

External links
http://www.ww2.dk/new/air%20force/regiment/bap/6bap.htm
http://www.ww2.dk/new/air%20force/regiment/shap/58apib.htm

Soviet Air Force bases
Soviet Frontal Aviation
Russian Air Force bases